Boston Scott (born April 27, 1995) is an American football running back for the Philadelphia Eagles of the National Football League (NFL) and professional Rocket League esports player of Dignitas. He played college football at Louisiana Tech. He was drafted by the New Orleans Saints in the sixth round of the 2018 NFL Draft. Scott has become known among Philadelphia Eagles fans as the “Giant Killer” due to his three touchdown performance during a road win by the Philadelphia Eagles against the New York Giants during Week 17 of the 2019 NFL regular season.

Early years
Scott attended Zachary High School where he was the leading rusher and earned local and state honors. He was a high school state champion in weightlifting.

College career

Scott played four seasons for Louisiana Tech. In his senior season at Louisiana Tech, the diminutive running back rushed for 937 yards on 163 attempts for a 5.7 yards per attempt regular season average. He amassed 1,301 yards overall offense contributing 108.4 yards per game in 2017. Scott was a watchlist candidate for the Wuerffel Trophy.

College statistics

Professional career

New Orleans Saints
Scott was drafted by the New Orleans Saints in the sixth round (201st overall) of the 2018 NFL Draft. On May 10, 2018, Scott signed his rookie contract with the Saints. After making the Saints' initial 53-man roster, he was waived on September 5, 2018, and was re-signed to the practice squad.

Philadelphia Eagles

Scott was signed off the Saints' practice squad by the Philadelphia Eagles on December 10, 2018.

Scott was waived during final roster cuts on August 31, 2019, but was re-signed to the team's practice squad the next day. He was promoted to the active roster on October 11, 2019. Scott scored his first professional touchdown on a 4-yard run on October 27, 2019, when the Eagles defeated the Buffalo Bills 31–13. On December 9, he had an extended role in a 23–17 overtime victory over the New York Giants and had 10 carries for 59 yards and a touchdown, along with six receptions for 69 yards. In Week 17 against the New York Giants, Scott rushed 19 times for 54 yards and three touchdowns and caught four passes for 84 yards during the 34–17 win that clinched a playoff spot for the Eagles. He was named NFC Offensive Player of the Week for his game against the Giants. He finished the 2019 season with 61 carries for 245 rushing yards and five rushing touchdowns to go along with 24 receptions for 204 receiving yards.

Scott's performance from the previous season earned him the backup running back position for 2020. On October 22, 2020, Scott made the game-winning touchdown catch on an 18-yard pass from Carson Wentz in a 22–21 win against the New York Giants, finishing with 92 total yards of offense. In addition to being the Eagles primary punt returner, he ended up starting four games at the running back position in relief of Miles Sanders. He totaled 80 carries for 374 rushing yards and one rushing touchdown to go along with 25 receptions for 212 receiving yards and one receiving touchdown.

Scott signed a one-year exclusive-rights free agent tender with the Eagles on April 1, 2021. He was placed on the COVID list on January 3, 2022. He was activated one week later on January 10, missing just one game where the Eagles did not play their starters. He finished the 2021 season with 87 carries for 373 rushing yards and seven rushing touchdowns in 16 games. He scored a 34-yard rushing touchdown in the 31–15 loss to the Tampa Bay Buccaneers in the Wild Card Round of the playoffs.

On March 18, 2022, Scott re-signed with the Eagles. In the 2022 season, Scott appeared in 15 games, of which he started two. He finished with 54 carries for 217 rushing yards and three touchdowns. Scott scored a rushing touchdown in both the Divisional Round against the New York Giants and the NFC Championship against the San Francisco 49ers. Scott helped the Eagles reach Super Bowl LVII.  In the Super Bowl, Scott had three carries for eight rushing yards and one catch for nine receiving yards in the Eagles 38-35 loss to the Kansas City Chiefs.

On March 15, 2023, Scott re-signed on another one-year contract with the Eagles.

NFL career statistics

Regular season

Playoffs

Esports career 

On February 3, 2022, Scott was signed to a multi-year deal with professional esports organization Dignitas as a content creator and substitute for their Rocket League roster.

References

External links

 Philadelphia Eagles bio
 Louisiana Tech Bulldogs football bio

1995 births
Living people
American football running backs
Louisiana Tech Bulldogs football players
New Orleans Saints players
Philadelphia Eagles players
Players of American football from Baton Rouge, Louisiana
Dignitas (esports) players
Rocket League players
Zachary High School alumni